Jose "Joe" A. Campos (born June 8, 1961) is a politician and businessman from Santa Rosa, New Mexico. Since 2003, he has served as a member of the New Mexico House of Representatives representing the 63rd district that includes DeBaca, Curry, Guadalupe, & Roosevelt counties.

Early life, family, and small business owner 
Joe Campos was born in Santa Rosa, New Mexico, son of a veteran, and is a graduate of the New Mexico Military Institute and the University of New Mexico. Campos is a small businessman who owns and operates Joseph's Restaurant in Santa Rosa with 34 employees. Joe Campos is married to wife of 24 years, Christina, who is the administrator at the Guadalupe Hospital in Santa Rosa.  They have three children, Analisa, Andrea, and Jose.

County Commissioner and Mayor of Santa Rosa 
Campos began his public service as a Guadalupe County commissioner serving from 1991-1992.

Campos continued his political career and was elected mayor of Santa Rosa in 1998 and is currently serving his third consecutive term.

State Representative 
Campos has served as a state representative since elected to office in 2003. He is the Chair of Voters and Elections Committee, interim Vice-Chair of the Mortgage Finance Oversight Committee, interim advisor to the New Mexico Finance Authority Oversight Committee and the Legislative Health and Human Services Committee and a member of the Business and Industry Committee.

Candidate for Lieutenant Governor 2010 
On August 11, 2009, Campos announced his intent to run for the Office of Lieutenant Governor in 2010 as a Democrat.

Sources

External links

official campaign web site
Profile at the New Mexico Legislature website
Transmission's the issue (Albuquerque Journal)
Lieutenant governor candidates tackle budget shortfall (Santa Fe New Mexican)
Joe stumps in Gallup (Gallup Independent)
La Politica meets with Joe

1961 births
County commissioners in New Mexico
Hispanic and Latino American state legislators in New Mexico
Living people
Mayors of places in New Mexico
Democratic Party members of the New Mexico House of Representatives
People from Santa Rosa, New Mexico